Wola Piotrowa  (Volia Petrova) is a village in East Małopolska in the Bukowsko Upland mountains, Bukowsko rural commune, Latin parish in Bukowsko, Protestant parish in loco.

Wola Piotrowa is about 17 miles from Sanok in southeast Poland. It is situated below the main watershed at the foot of the Słonne Mountain, and has an elevation of 340 metres. Situated in the Subcarpathian Voivodship (since 1999), previously in Krosno Voivodship (1975-1998) and Sanok district, (10 miles east of Sanok),  located near the towns of Medzilaborce and Palota (in northeastern Slovakia).

Twin cities
 Topoľovka
 Maizières-lès-Metz

Literature
Tarnovich, Julian.  Illustrated History of Lemkivshchyna. (Ukrainian Language Publication) Lviv, 1935, Reprinted in New York, NY 1964.
Iwanusiw, Oleh Wolodymyr.  Church in Ruins/Церква в руїнi (English/Ukrainian Edition) A Publication of St. Sophia Religious Association of Ukrainian Catholics in Canada, St. Catharines, 1987. Volya Petrova, retrieved March 8, 2012.
 Prof. Adam Fastnacht.  Slownik Historyczno-Geograficzny Ziemi Sanockiej w Średniowieczu (Historic-Geographic Dictionary of the Sanok District in the Middle Ages), Kraków, 2002, .
Krasovsky, Ivan.  Surnames of Galician Lemkos in the 18th Century.  Lemko Foundation & Library, L'viv, 1993.
 Shematism of the Greek Catholic Apostolic Administration of Lemkivshchyna.  (Ukrainian Language Publication.)  Original Printing in 1936, Lviv.  Reprinted in 1970 by the Ukrainian Museum & Library of Stamford, CT.  See p. 6, entry on Karlykiv.
 Jerzy Zuba. "W Gminie Bukowsko." Roksana, 2004,  (Polish). English translation of 1999 edition, Deborah Greenlee, Editor, 2005, Arlington, TX 76016.

External links
"Village Histories and Surnames" - Weblog, The Lemko Project.  http://lemkoproject.blogspot.com/p/village-histories-and-surnames.html
Maps and Additional Information on Wola Piotrowa on Philip Semanchuk's website, courtesy of Jerzy Cwiakala. http://semanchuk.com/gen/data/WolaPiotrowa/
 Wola Piotrowa
 Caritas in Zboiska
 Castle in Zboiska

Villages in Sanok County
Populated places established in 1526